Nuapada is a town in western region of Odisha state of eastern India. It is the headquarter of Nuapada district. Nuapada district was carved out of the undivided Kalahandi district on 27 March 1993. It is on the western border of Odisha with Chhattisgarh. The district is part of Odisha both linguistically and culturally. It is one of the most underdeveloped districts of Odisha and India as well.

Demographics
Nuapada has an estimated population of 6,10,382 people. With the male population contributing 3,01,962 and female population contributing 3,08,420 to the total population. It has almost equal number of males and females. The estimated number of literate people in the total population is 2,99,383. It is clear that it has a low literacy rate.

Places of interest
 
Situated 18 km from Nuapada Yogeswar temple at Patora is famous for its ancient and old Shiva Linga. Gulshan Kumar helped for the construction of the new temple.

Politics
Current MLA from Nuapada Assembly Constituency is BJD candidate Sri Rajendra Dholakia, who won the seat in State elections of 2019.  This is his third term as MLA. His first term  was in the year 2004 as an independent candidate. Previous MLAs from this seat were Basant Kumar Panda of BJP who contested as the Member of Parliament from Kalahandi in 2019 after his two terms as MLA, Ghasi Ram Majhi who won representing JD in 1995 and 1990 and representing JNP in 1985 and in 1977, and Bhanuprakash Joshi of INC(I) in 1980.

Nawapara district is part of the Kalahandi (Lok Sabha constituency).

People and culture
The language spoken in Nuapada is a mixture of Odia and Chhattisgarhi dialect. Although it is a district headquarters, the culture is predominantly rural and agrarian. Nuapada has often been in news for alleged instances of starvation deaths in nearby places like Komana, Boden and Sinapali. Betting and country liquor is a common pastime for the local people as the place does not have any modern entertainment avenue. There is no cinema, theatre or sports facility in Nuapada.

The most famous personality of Nuapada is Ghasiram Majhi, who has been a four time Member of Odisha Legislative Assembly from Nuapada constituency.

Schools
The main schools in Nuapada are-
Kendriya Vidyalaya Nuapada
Odisha Adarsha Vidyalaya ( Model School )
Gyanjyoti KR Vidyalaya
National High School
St.Mary Public School
K.N Kids Public School
MEC Public School.
Raja A T High school khariar

References

Cities and towns in Nuapada district